Willem de Sitter (6 May 1872 – 20 November 1934) was a Dutch mathematician, physicist, and astronomer.

Life and work
Born in Sneek, de Sitter studied mathematics at the University of Groningen and then joined the Groningen astronomical laboratory. He worked at the Cape Observatory in South Africa (1897–1899). Then, in 1908, de Sitter was appointed to the chair of astronomy at Leiden University. He was director of the Leiden Observatory from 1919 until his death.

De Sitter made major contributions to the field of physical cosmology. He co-authored a paper with Albert Einstein in 1932 in which they discussed the implications of cosmological data for the curvature of the universe. He also came up with the concept of the de Sitter space and de Sitter universe, a solution for Einstein's general relativity in which there is no matter and a positive cosmological constant.  This results in an exponentially expanding, empty universe. De Sitter was also famous for his research on the motions of the moons of Jupiter.

Willem de Sitter died after a brief illness in November 1934.

Honours
In 1912, he became a member of the Royal Netherlands Academy of Arts and Sciences.

Awards
James Craig Watson Medal (1929)
Bruce Medal (1931)
Gold Medal of the Royal Astronomical Society (1931)
Prix Jules Janssen, the highest award of the Société astronomique de France, the French astronomical society (1934)

Named after him
The crater De Sitter on the Moon
Asteroid 1686 De Sitter
de Sitter universe
de Sitter space
Anti-de Sitter space
de Sitter invariant special relativity
Einstein–de Sitter universe
de Sitter double star experiment
de Sitter precession
de Sitter–Schwarzschild metric

Family
One of his sons, Ulbo de Sitter (1902 – 1980), was a Dutch geologist, and one of Ulbos's sons was a Dutch sociologist Ulbo de Sitter (1930 – 2010).

Another son of Willem, Aernout de Sitter (1905 – 15 September 1944), was the director of the Bosscha Observatory in Lembang, Indonesia (then the Dutch East Indies), where he studied the Messier 4 globular cluster.

Selected publications

 On Einstein's theory of gravitation and its astronomical consequences:

See also

 de Sitter double star experiment
 de Sitter precession
 de Sitter relativity
 de Sitter space
 de Sitter universe
 Anti-de Sitter space
 The Dreams in the Witch House, a story by H. P. Lovecraft featuring de Sitter, and inspired by his lecture The Size of the Universe

References

External links

 
 P.C. van der Kruit Willem de Sitter (1872 – 1934) in: History of science and scholarship in the Netherlands.
 A. Blaauw, Sitter, Willem de (1872–1934), in Biografisch Woordenboek van Nederland.
 Bruce Medal page
 Awarding of Bruce Medal: PASP 43 (1931) 125
 Awarding of RAS gold medal: MNRAS 91 (1931) 422
 de Sitter's binary star arguments against Ritz's relativity theory (1913) (four articles)

Obituaries
 AN 253 (1934) 495/496 (one line)
 JRASC 29 (1935) 1
 MNRAS 95 (1935) 343
 Obs 58 (1935) 22
 PASP 46 (1934) 368 (one paragraph)
 PASP 47 (1935) 65

1872 births
1934 deaths
19th-century Dutch astronomers
19th-century Dutch mathematicians
20th-century Dutch astronomers
Dutch relativity theorists
20th-century Dutch mathematicians
Cosmologists
People from Sneek
Academic staff of Leiden University
University of Groningen alumni
Members of the Royal Netherlands Academy of Arts and Sciences
Foreign associates of the National Academy of Sciences
Recipients of the Gold Medal of the Royal Astronomical Society
Presidents of the International Astronomical Union